Hefferon is a surname. Notable people with the surname include:

Charles Hefferon (1878–1931), South African long-distance runner
Jim Hefferon (born 1958), American mathematician
John A. Hefferon (born 1950), American physician
Thomas Hefferon (born 1982), Irish film director